Zach Helm (born January 21, 1975) is an American film director, producer, and screenwriter. He wrote the internationally-performed stage play Good Canary, wrote and directed the film Mr. Magorium's Wonder Emporium (2007) and has staged one-man performance pieces, most notably his revival of Spalding Gray's Interviewing the Audience. Helm was born in Santa Clara, California.

Career 
In 2006 Helm was approached to direct Mr. Magorium's Wonder Emporium, for which he had previously written a screenplay. Helm said that the film and production process were troubled . In 2013, he described the movie as a "Technicolor train-wreck" as reported by online tabloid news source TMZ.

Helm also wrote the 2006 fantasy comedy-drama film Stranger than Fiction.

He began Interviewing the Audience in 2008, a revival of one of Spalding Gray's performance pieces which he had seen while in college. As the title suggests, audience members are brought onto stage and interviewed, their personal stories and insights extracted in long-form conversations meant to create a sense of communal intimacy but challenge the convention of theater and story. Helm's approach differed from Gray's in that Helm's conversations were entirely extemporaneous, without any prepared questions, and the audience members were drawn at random. Helm tended to find and illuminate themes and connections within the interviews, thereby creating a through-line for each performance as it happened.

Helm wrote Le Bon Canari (Good Canary), which was produced in France in 2007, then translated into Spanish (El Buen Canario) and produced in Mexico. It was translated into English in 2016 for the Rose Theatre Kingston. Drawn from Helm's personal experiences, the play is known for its dark humor, coarse language, and views on sexism and misogyny as well as its use of Brechtian devices.

In 2015, Helm directed Culo Quasars Cocaine Chaos, which he adapted from the true story of Paul Frampton. He adapted the Epic Magazine article "The Mercenary" for Fox in 2016, collaborating with journalists Josh Davis and Josh Bearman.

Personal life 
Helm was married to actress Kiele Sanchez from 2001 to 2008.

Filmography
Feature films

TV movies

References

External links 

1975 births
Living people
DePaul University alumni
American male screenwriters
People from Sierra County, California
Film directors from California
21st-century American dramatists and playwrights
American male dramatists and playwrights
21st-century American male writers
Screenwriters from California
21st-century American screenwriters